Sprite commonly refers to:
 Sprite (drink), a lemon-lime beverage produced by the Coca-Cola Company
 Sprite (computer graphics), a smaller bitmap composited onto another by hardware or software
 Sprite (folklore), a type of legendary creature including elves, fairies, and pixies

Sprite may also refer to:

Comics 

Sprite (Eternal), a fictional member of the race of Eternals in the Marvel Universe
 Sprite (manga), a 2009 Japanese manga series
Sprite, alias of the Marvel Comics character Kitty Pryde
Sprite comic, a webcomic that consists primarily of computer sprites from video games

Computing and technology
 Sprite (operating system), an operating system developed at the University of California, Berkeley
 SPRITE (spacecraft), a proposed Saturn atmospheric probe mission
 SPRITE infrared detector, a specialist detector device using a process known as signal processing in the element
 De Havilland Sprite, a British rocket engine

Vehicles
 Sprite (motorcycle), a historical British make of motorcycle
 Sprite-class tanker, a class of spirit tankers of the Royal Fleet Auxiliary
 Austin-Healey Sprite, a British car
 Austin-Healey Sebring Sprite, a modification
 Practavia Sprite, a British two-seat home-built training or touring aircraft
 Schweizer SGS 1-36 Sprite, an American sailplane design

Zoology
 Sprite butterflies, certain skipper butterfly genera in subfamily Pyrginae, tribe Celaenorrhinini:
 Celaenorrhinus (typical sprites)
 Katreus (giant scarce sprite)
 Loxolexis (scarce sprites)
 Sedge sprite, a species of damselfly in the family Coenagrionidae
 Sprite possum, an extinct marsupial

Other
 Sprite (lightning)
 Sprites (band), from the U.S.
 "Sprite" (song), by Beat Crusaders on the album Sexcite!
 Sprite melon, a type of sweet melon cultivated in North Carolina
 Sprite (Artemis Fowl)
 Sprite (Dungeons & Dragons)
 Water sprite, the freshwater fern Ceratopteris thalictroides

See also
 Sea Sprite (disambiguation)